Luis Felipe Fernandes Rodrigues (born January 29, 1996), or simply Luis Felipe, is an American professional soccer player who currently plays for USL Championship side Sacramento Republic.

Career

North American Soccer League
On January 25, 2016, he signed his first professional contract with the Fort Lauderdale Strikers. He was praised by Head Coach and General Manager Caio Zanardi: “We are confident that in our system he can develop his potential and blossom into a wonderful player for our team.” He started his first match on April 7, 2016 and his performance was considered "shining".
Luis Felipe Fernandes was in 2016's season the player of Fort Lauderdale Strikers with most minutes played. He was nominated for the Young Player of the Year of NASL.

United Soccer League
Luis Felipe signed with USL side and San Jose Earthquakes affiliate Reno 1868 FC on May 12, 2017. He scored his first goal for the team on June 7 in Reno's 3-2 victory over Rio Grande Valley FC and assisted the winning goal eleven minutes later. Fernandes made his first appearance for San Jose as a 33rd minute substitution for Tommy Thompson during the MLS side's 4-1 friendly victory over Eintracht Frankfurt.

Major League Soccer
Luis Felipe was signed by the San Jose Earthquakes on December 14, 2017, along with Reno teammates Chris Wehan and Jimmy Ockford. He was then sent back to Reno on a temporary loan basis, playing in Reno's 2018 home opener against Swope Park Rangers.

Following the 2020 season, San Jose declined their option on Fernandes.

Return to the USL
On January 29, 2021, Felipe signed with USL Championship side Sacramento Republic.

Statistics
Statistics accurate as of 19 March 2018.

References

External links
 

1996 births
Living people
American sportspeople of Brazilian descent
American soccer players
Association football midfielders
Fort Lauderdale Strikers players
Major League Soccer players
North American Soccer League players
People from Mineola, New York
Reno 1868 FC players
Sacramento Republic FC players
San Jose Earthquakes players
Soccer players from New York (state)
Sportspeople from Nassau County, New York
USL Championship players